Evgeny Agrest (born 15 August 1966 in Vitebsk) is a Soviet-born Swedish chess grandmaster (1997).

In 1994, he graduated with a degree in Economics and in the same year emigrated to Sweden. He is four-time Swedish champion (1998, 2001, 2003, and 2004), and thrice Nordic champion (2001 jointly with Artur Kogan, 2003 jointly with Curt Hansen, and 2005). In 2010 Agrest tied for 1st–6th in the European Union Championship, taking third place on tiebreak. He played for Sweden in the Chess Olympiads of 1998, 2000, 2002, 2004, 2006, 2008, 2010 and 2014.

He has been Nils Grandelius's trainer since 2013.

Agrest is married to Woman International Master (WIM) Svetlana Agrest (external link).

Books

References

External links
 Evgenij Agrest chess games at 365Chess.com
 
 Svetlana Agrest (Dutch Wikipedia)

1966 births
Living people
Chess grandmasters
Chess Olympiad competitors
Swedish chess players
Russian emigrants to Sweden
Swedish people of Russian-Jewish descent
Chess writers
Sportspeople from Vitebsk
Belarusian emigrants to Sweden